Giovanni Di Veroli (11 August 1932 – 1 June 2018) was an Italian professional footballer who played for Lazio, as a defender. Di Veroli was Jewish and began his career with Blue Star, a Jewish sports team.

References

1932 births
2018 deaths
Italian footballers
S.S. Lazio players
Serie A players
Association football defenders
20th-century Italian Jews
Jewish footballers
Footballers from Rome